Events from the year 1857 in the United States.

Incumbents

Federal Government 
 President: Franklin Pierce (D-New Hampshire) (until March 4), James Buchanan (D-Pennsylvania) (starting March 4)
 Vice President: vacant (until March 4), John C. Breckinridge (D-Kentucky) (starting March 4)
 Chief Justice: Roger B. Taney (Maryland)
 Speaker of the House of Representatives: Nathaniel P. Banks (American-Massachusetts) (until March 4), James Lawrence Orr (D-South Carolina) (starting December 7)
 Congress: 34th (until March 4), 35th (starting March 4)

Events

 January 9 – The 7.9  Fort Tejon earthquake affects Central and Southern California with a maximum Mercalli intensity of IX (Violent).
 February 3 – The National Deaf Mute College (later renamed Gallaudet University) is established in Washington, D.C., becoming the first school for the advanced education of the deaf.
March 4 – James Buchanan is sworn in as the 15th President of the United States, and John C. Breckinridge is sworn in as Vice President of the United States.
 March 6 – Dred Scott v. Sanford: The Supreme Court of the United States rules that Blacks are not citizens and slaves can not sue for freedom, driving the country further towards the American Civil War (the ruling is not overturned until the 14th Amendment in 1868).
 March 12 – Elizabeth Blackwell opens a hospital, the New York Infirmary for Indigent Women and Children.
 May 25 – Flying Eagle cent released for circulation.
 May 26 – Dred Scott is emancipated by the Blow family, his original owners.
 July 18 – The Utah Expedition leaves Fort Leavenworth, effectively beginning the Utah War.
 August 24 – Ohio Life Insurance and Trust Company suspends payments, leading to the Panic of 1857.
 September 11 – Mountain Meadows massacre in Utah.
 September 12 – The  sinks off the coast of North Carolina, killing 425 people.
 October 1 – Eviction of last residents of Seneca Village to make way for New York City's Central Park is completed.
 October 13 – Panic of 1857: New York banks close and do not reopen until December 12.

Undated
 Speculation in U.S. railroad shares causes financial crisis in Europe.
 The seat of government of Iowa is moved from Iowa City to modern-day Des Moines.
 The Mormons abandon the Las Vegas Valley of Nevada.
 Maryland politician William Daniel proposes the Local Option for prohibition.

Ongoing
 Bleeding Kansas (1854–1860)
 Third Seminole War (1855–1858)
 Utah War (1857–1858)

Births
 January 6 – Milward Adams, orchestra and theatre manager born in Lexington, Kentucky.(died 1923)
 January 11 – William Gentles, U.S. Army private, known for killing Crazy Horse (died 1878)
 February 1 – Lucy Wheelock, early childhood education pioneer within the kindergarten movement (died 1946)
 February 7 – Benjamin Eli Smith, editor of reference books (died 1913)
 February 13 – Almanzo Wilder, writer (died 1949)
 March 6 – George Dayton, businessman, founder of Target Corporation (died 1938) 
 March 7 – Genevieve Stebbins, performer of the Delsarte system of expression (died 1934)
 March 20 – Benjamin F. Shively, U.S. Senator from Indiana from 1909 to 1916 (died 1916)
 March 21
 Charles Ellis Johnson, photographer (died 1926)
 Hunter Liggett, general (died 1935)
 April 22 – Paul Dresser, songwriter (died 1906)
 May 17 – Mary Devens, pictorial photographer (died 1920)
 May 19 – John Jacob Abel, pharmacologist (died 1938)
 June 8 – Lawrence Marston, actor, playwright and film director (died 1939)
 June 10 – Caroline Louise Dudley (Mrs. Leslie Carter), stage actress (died 1937)
 June 20 – Mary Gage Day, physician (died 1935)
 July 1 – Martha Hughes Cannon, politician (died 1932)
 July 30
 Lucy Bacon, California Impressionist painter (died 1932)
 Thorstein Veblen, economist (died 1929)
 August 8 – Henry Fairfield Osborn, geologist, paleontologist and eugenist (died 1935)
 September 13 – Milton S. Hershey, chocolate manufacturer (died 1945)
 September 14 – Julia Platt, embryologist and politician (died 1935)
 September 15 – William Howard Taft, 27th President of the United States from 1909 t0 1913 and tenth Chief Justice of the United States from 1921 to 1930 (died 1930)
 October 7 – George P. McLean, U.S. Senator from Connecticut from 1911 to 1923 (died 1932)
 October 17 – Mary Abbott, golfer (died 1904)
 October 24 – Ned Williamson, baseball player (died 1894)
 November 5 – Ida Tarbell, investigative journalist (died 1944)
 December 1 – Samuel M. Ralston, U.S. Senator from Indiana from 1923 to 1925 (died 1925)
 December 2
 J. Frank Allee, U.S. Senator from Delaware from 1903 to 1907 (died 1938)
 Charles E. Rushmore, businessman, attorney, namesake of Mount Rushmore (died 1931)
 December 4 – Julia Evelyn Ditto Young, poet and novelist (died 1915)

Deaths
 February 16 – Elisha Kane, Arctic explorer (born 1820)
 May 1 – Stephen Adams, U.S. Senator from Mississippi from 1852 to 1857 (born 1807)
 May 26 – James Bell, U.S. Senator from New Hampshire from 1855 to 1857 (born 1804)
 June 19 – Alexander Twilight, educator and minister, first African-American known to have earned a bachelor's degree from an American college or university (Middlebury College, 1823) (born 1795)
 July 4 – William L. Marcy, 21st Secretary of State from 1853 to 1857 (born 1786)
 September 15 – John Henderson, U.S. Senator from Mississippi from 1839 to 1845 (born 1797)
 October 7 – Louis McLane, U.S. Senator from Delaware from 1827 to 1829 (born 1786)
 October 10 – Thomas Crawford, sculptor (born 1814)
 October 20 – John Diamond, minstrel dancer (born 1823)
 October 27 – John Blennerhassett Martin, painter, engraver and lithographer (born 1797)
 December 24 – Robert C. Nicholas, U.S. Senator from Louisiana from 1836 to 1841 (born 1793)
 Jasper Grosvenor, financier (born 1794)
 Aspasia Cruvellier Mirault, planter and landowner  (born 1800)

See also
Timeline of United States history (1820–1859)

References

External links
 

 
1850s in the United States
United States
United States
Years of the 19th century in the United States